() was a Spanish legal phrase, literally meaning "relaxed in person",  meaning "transferred to the secular authorities", a euphemism for "burnt at the stake" in the records of the Spanish Inquisition, since the church tribunal could not execute death sentences. Use of the term in source material continues until 1659 or later. 

Examples:
 .
 '.

Historians may also use the term anachronistically, for example as in the case of the last burning in Peru, that of Mariana de Castro, Lima, 1732.

References

Spanish Inquisition
Spanish words and phrases
Torture
Euphemisms
Execution methods
Catholic Church legal terminology
Spanish legal terminology